Kisko Milega Cash is a reality show aired on STAR One in 2008.

Guests
Rucha Gujrati
Renuka Shahane
Sudha Chandran
Vidya Malvade
Shivaji Satam
Jaya Bhattacharya

Indian reality television series
Star One (Indian TV channel) original programming
2008 Indian television series debuts
2008 Indian television series endings